An inverted papilloma, also known as Ringertz tumour, is a type of tumor in which surface  epithelial cells grow downward into the underlying supportive tissue. It may occur in the nose and/or sinuses or in the urinary tract (bladder, renal pelvis, ureter, urethra). When it occurs in the nose or sinuses, it may cause symptoms similar to those caused by sinusitis, such as nasal congestion. When it occurs in the urinary tract, it may cause blood in the urine.

Diagnosis

Inverted papillomas are definitively diagnosed by histologic examination. However, magnetic resonance imaging (MRI) may show a characteristic feature described as a convoluted cerebriform pattern (CCP). A retrospective study published in the American Journal of Neuroradiology concluded that identification of CCP by MRI in a patient with a nasal tumor made the diagnosis of Inverted papilloma quite likely. The study reported the sensitivity and specificity to be 100% and 87% respectively. CCP can be associated with other malignant tumors as well.

Treatment

Medial maxillectomy is the treatment of choice.

History
Inverted papillomae were first described by Nils Ringertz in 1938. He reported their microscopic appearance and their tendency to grow into the connective tissue stroma.

Additional images

References

External links 

 Inverted papilloma entry in the public domain NCI Dictionary of Cancer Terms

Benign neoplasms
Nose disorders
Urological neoplasia